Wes Climer (born September 26, 1982) is an American politician. He is a member of the South Carolina Senate from the 15th District, serving since 2016. He is a member of the Republican party.

References

Living people
1982 births
Republican Party South Carolina state senators
21st-century American politicians
People from Charlotte, North Carolina
Furman University alumni